This article documents the professional media works of Oprah Winfrey.

Television

Movies

Radio

Books
Make the Connection : Ten Steps to a Better Body and a Better Life, by Bob Greene and Oprah Winfrey, 1999; .
Journey to Beloved, by Oprah Winfrey and Ken Regan, 1998; 0786864583.
The Uncommon Wisdom of Oprah Winfrey : A Portrait in Her Own Words, by Bill Adler (ed) and Oprah Winfrey, 1997; .
A Journal of Daily Renewal : The Companion to Make the Connection, by Bob Greene and Oprah Winfrey, 1996; .
In The Kitchen With Rosie: Oprah's Favorite Recipes, by Rosie Daley and Oprah Winfrey, 1994; .

Oprah Winfrey